Eran Meshorer (Hebrew: ערן משורר, born May 12, 1971) is an Israeli scientist, professor of epigenetics and stem cells at the Alexander Silberman Institute of Life Sciences, and The Edmond and Lily Safra Center for Brain Sciences, the Hebrew University of Jerusalem. Meshorer is the Arthur Gutterman Chair for Stem Cell Research.

Biography 
Meshorer was born and raised in Israel. He completed all his degrees at the Hebrew University. Meshorer performed his PhD in molecular neuroscience under the supervision of Hermona Soreq, where he studied long-lasting consequences of stress in the mammalian brain. Together with Soreq, he published his first book (in Hebrew) titled 'Stressed Out'. In 2004, Meshorer traveled to the United States for postdoctoral studies at the National Institutes of Health (NIH) in Bethesda, Maryland, where he specialized in epigenetics and embryonic stem cells in the research group of Tom Misteli. Meshorer showed for the first time the epigenetic plasticity of embryonic stem cells.

In 2007 Meshorer returned to Israel, and established his 'Epigenetics, Stem Cells & Neurons' lab at the Department of Genetics, the Alexander Silberman Institute of Life Sciences, the Hebrew University of Jerusalem. In 2014 he was invited as a visiting professor to the Whitehead Institute, MIT and the Broad Institute, where he spent half a year.

Eran is married to Tali Meshorer, a father of three, and lives in Neve Ilan.

Research 
Meshorer conducts experimental and computational research in the field of epigenetics, molecular biology, pluripotent stem cells, disease models, and epigenetics of ancient DNA. He published over a hundred papers in these fields, and edited several books including The Cell Biology of Stem Cells (2010) with Kathrin Plath (UCLA) and Stem Cell Epigenetics (2019) with Giuseppe Testa (IEO).

In a series of papers, Meshorer discovered the unique epigenetics of embryonic and cancer stem cells, and the mechanisms supporting it, and together with Gil Ast from Tel-Aviv University, they showed the connection between chromatin and splicing.

Paleo-Epigenetics 
In 2014, in collaboration with Liran Carmel, they developed a computational technique to reconstruct genome-wide maps of DNA methylation (a key epigenetic mechanism) from ancient DNA sequences. They applied this technique to ancient DNA from Neanderthal and Denisovan, and thus were the first to reconstruct epigenetic patterns of archaic humans, and to identify genes that are differentially methylated between archaic and modern humans. These genes include many that are expressed in the brain, and are associated with neurological disorders such as Alzheimer's disease, autism and schizophrenia. This work was selected among the top ten discoveries of 2014 by Archaeology magazine.

In 2020 Carmel and Meshorer were able to show that the vocal and facial anatomy of modern humans differs from that of Neanderthals and Denisovans, which points at evolutionary processes during the past hundreds of thousands of years that affected the modern human voice box. In another collaboration with the Carmel lab, they generated a first anatomical profile of the Denisovan. This work was selected among the scientific breakthroughs of 2019 by Science magazine, and was selected among the 10 top stories of the year by Science News.

Awards and honors 
 For his PhD dissertation (2003), Meshorer received the Teva and ISBMB (Israel Society for Biochemistry and Molecular Biology) Award
 The Lilly-Molecular Psychiatry Award for best paper of 2005
 The Hestrin Prize for a young researcher from the ISBMB

References

External links 
 Meshorer lab's website
 Meshorer's lab at the Institute of Life Sciences
 Meshorer's lab at the Edmond and Lily Center for Brain Sciences
 

Israeli geneticists
1971 births
Living people
Epigeneticists
21st-century Israeli scientists
Hebrew University of Jerusalem alumni
Academic staff of the Hebrew University of Jerusalem